Season 2011–12 for Hibernian was their 13th consecutive season of play in the Scottish Premier League (SPL).  The season began on 24 July with a 2–0 home defeat by Celtic, who eliminated Hibs from the Scottish League Cup. With the club near the bottom of the league, manager Colin Calderwood was sacked and replaced with Pat Fenlon in November. Fenlon made several signings during January that helped the club to avoid relegation from the SPL. Hibs also reached the 2012 Scottish Cup Final, but this was lost 5–1 to local rivals Hearts.

Friendlies 

Hibs announced details of four friendly pre-season fixtures against Scottish Football League opposition on 18 May 2011. Amid uncertainty over the future of manager Colin Calderwood, linked with a return to English football, Hibs won their first pre-season friendly, against Berwick Rangers. Former Celtic player Cillian Sheridan joined the club on trial and scored in a 3–1 win at East Fife. Hibs made an offer to sign Sheridan, but he eventually joined St Johnstone instead. A match against Barnsley, scheduled for 16 July, was called off due to a waterlogged pitch.

Fixtures

Scottish Premier League 

Hibernian started the league season with a home game against Celtic, which ended in a 2–0 defeat. In their second game, Hibs won 1–0 against Inverness CT thanks to an injury time goal by Garry O'Connor. It was their first win in 10 attempts at the Caledonian Stadium. Poor results, particularly at home, meant that Hibs were just one point off the bottom of the league in mid-October. The club also recorded a financial loss of £900,000 for the year ended 31 July 2011, the first bottom line loss in seven years. Hibs sacked manager Colin Calderwood on 6 November 2011, two days before the club AGM. Billy Brown, who had been sacked by Hearts in August and then hired by Hibs as assistant manager, was made caretaker manager.

Bohemians manager Pat Fenlon was recruited as the new Hibs manager later in November. His first game officially in charge, an away match against Motherwell, was abandoned at half-time due to safety reasons. A small fire had broken out inside the floodlights during the first half. Hibs earned only one point from Fenlon's first five matches in charge. After an Edinburgh derby defeat on 2 January, Hibs were still just one point above the bottom position. Despite progressing to the semi-final of the Scottish Cup, Hibs continued to struggle in the SPL and are in a two-way fight with Dunfermline to avoid relegation. A win against Inverness lifted Hibs six points clear of the Fife club with six games to play.

Hibs went into the post-split fixtures in 11th place, seven points ahead of Dunfermline, who occupied the relegation position. Dunfermline manager Jim Jefferies said that they would need to win their first post-split fixture, against St Mirren, to stand a realistic chance of avoiding relegation. Dunfermline took four points from their first two games after the split, while Hibs suffered two 1–0 defeats, which cut the gap to three points. Hibs responded by winning 2–1 at Aberdeen, which meant that Dunfermline needed to beat Hibs in their next match to avoid relegation. Hibs ended any relegation worries, however, with a 4–0 victory.

Fixtures

Scottish Cup 

Hibs entered the 2011–12 Scottish Cup in the fourth round, with an away tie against Second Division leaders Cowdenbeath. Hibs conceded the opening goal after just 19 seconds, but recovered to win 3–2. In the fifth round, Hibs were drawn to play the winner of a replay between Dundee and Kilmarnock. Kilmarnock won 2–1 in that replay and advanced to the fifth round tie against Hibs. Hibs beat Kilmarnock 1–0 in the tie, with Irish striker Eoin Doyle scoring the only goal of the game. This meant that Hibs progressed to the quarter-final, and were drawn against the winner of a postponed tie between First Division clubs Ayr United and Falkirk. Ayr won 2–1 against Falkirk to set up the tie against Hibs.

Hibs progressed to the semi-finals, for the first time since 2007, with a 2–0 win at Somerset Park. The semi-final draw paired Hibs with Aberdeen, while league leaders Celtic were drawn against the winners of a replay between Hearts and St Mirren. A late goal by Leigh Griffiths gave Hibs a 2–1 victory against Aberdeen, and therefore a place in the 2012 Scottish Cup Final. Hearts defeated Celtic in the second semi-final to set up a first Edinburgh derby in a Scottish Cup Final since 1896.

The final, however, ended in a 5–1 defeat for Hibs, extending their wait to win the Scottish Cup. Hibs went 2–0 down inside 30 minutes, but James McPake scored for Hibs just before half-time. The decisive moment came just after half-time, when referee Craig Thomson awarded a penalty kick to Hearts (which was converted) and sent off Pa Kujabi for a second yellow card. Hearts added two further goals in the second half to complete the scoring. Hibs manager Pat Fenlon apologised to the Hibs supporters for the lack of desire shown by their players. Former Hibs captain Murdo MacLeod described their display as inept and only absolved McPake from his criticism.

Fixtures

Scottish League Cup 

Having failed to qualify for European competition in the previous season, Hibernian entered the Scottish League Cup at the second round stage. The club were drawn to play Berwick Rangers at home. Hibs progressed to the third round with a comfortable victory. In the third round, Hibs were drawn in one of the two all-SPL ties, away to Motherwell. Hibs won on a penalty shootout after a 2–2 draw at Fir Park. They were again drawn against SPL opposition in the quarter-final, at home to Celtic. Hibs took an early lead in that tie, but were eventually beaten 4–1.

Fixtures

Transfers 
Hibs announced on 29 April that 10 players would be released at the end of their contracts, including loan signing Darryl Duffy. The first two signings of the summer by Hibs were to bring back former heroes Ivan Sproule and Garry O'Connor. This move was questioned by former manager John Hughes, who asked whether they would show the sharpness necessary in their attacking positions. After O'Connor scored a match-winning goal early in the season, however, The Scotsman football writer Stuart Bathgate questioned this logic. After a week in which Hibs signed Isaiah Osbourne and Phil Airey, manager Colin Calderwood commented that he was still looking for more additions to the squad.

Calderwood was sacked in November 2011 and replaced by Bohemians manager Pat Fenlon, who returned to Ireland to make his first signing, Sligo Rovers striker Eoin Doyle. In January 2012, Hibs released Junior Agogo, Victor Pálsson and Matt Thornhill. Towards the end of January, Fenlon made several additions to the squad, mainly using the loan market. These signings, particularly central defender James McPake, helped Hibs to retain their position in the SPL and a placed in the 2012 Scottish Cup Final.

Players in

Players out

Loans in

Loans out

Player stats 

During the 2011–12 season, Hibs used 35 different players in competitive games. The table below shows the number of appearances and goals scored by each player.

|}

See also
List of Hibernian F.C. seasons

References

External links
2011–12 Hibernian F.C. season at ESPN

Hibernian F.C. seasons
Hibernian